Park Soon-kyung (born 1923 - 24 October 2020) was a South Korean Methodist theologian.

Biography 
Born in Yeoju of Gyeonggi Province, Park first studied nursing before pursuing degrees in theology at Methodist Theological University in Seoul and philosophy at Seoul National University. She went for further studies in the United States, pursuing an M.Div. at Emory University and a Ph.D. at Drew University, completing a dissertation in 1966 on "Man in Karl Barth's doctrine of election."

Park returned to South Korea and was a professor of theology for 22 years at Ewha Woman's University (1966–1988), where she continued to hold a post as a professor emerita. She is known for her work towards a theology for the unification of North and South Korea, drawing from and critiquing minjung theology, and for the promotion of South Korean feminist theology.

References 

1923 births
2020 deaths
Women Christian theologians
South Korean theologians
Academic staff of Ewha Womans University
Duke University alumni
Emory University alumni
South Korean Methodists
People from Yeoju
South Korean expatriates in the United States
Liberation theologians